Knox Township is one of twelve townships in Jay County, Indiana, United States. As of the 2010 census, its population was 503 and it contained 215 housing units.

History
Knox Township was organized in 1839. It was named after Knox County, Ohio.

Geography
The streams of Bit Run, Corrode Run, Cowboy Run, Crooked Creek, Harris Creek, Holster Creek, Mud Creek, Oak Run, Oval Run, Phillips Run, Rustic Run and Wire Run run through this township.

Unincorporated towns
 Ridertown

Adjacent townships
 Penn Township (north)
 Greene Township (east)
 Jefferson Township (southeast)
 Richland Township (south)
 Jackson Township, Blackford County (west)
 Harrison Township, Blackford County (northwest)

Cemeteries
The township contains one cemetery, Winters.

Major highways

Airports and landing strips
 Kesler Field

References
 
 United States Census Bureau cartographic boundary files

External links
 Indiana Township Association
 United Township Association of Indiana

Townships in Jay County, Indiana
Townships in Indiana